Catherine Cannuli (born 3 March 1986) is an Australian soccer coach and former player who is coach of the Western Sydney Wanderers in the W-League. She played national league football in the Women's National Soccer League for the NSW Sapphires and the W-League for Sydney FC, Brisbane Roar and Western Sydney Wanderers. She also played for Inter Lions in the NSW Women's Premier League. She also played four times for Australia.

Playing career

Club career
Cannuli began playing soccer at the age of seven for the Marconi Stallions, initially playing in a team where she was the only female player.

Cannuli played for the NSW Sapphires in the Women's National Soccer League (WNSL) from the 2000–01 WNSL season. She played in the Sapphires' championship-winning team in 2003.

In 2004, Cannuli stepped away from the game, returning in 2008 with Inter Lions. She was soon invited to train with Sydney FC.

Ahead of the 2011 W-League season, Cannuli joined Brisbane Roar where she played 11 matches in a single season in the Queensland capital.

On 31 January 2014, Cannuli announced her retirement at the conclusion of the season. In her last home match for Western Sydney Wanderers, during the Sydney Derby, Cannuli scored a penalty with the last kick of the match.

International career
Cannuli made her debut for the Matildas on 12 May 2011 in a 3–0 friendly win against New Zealand at Bluetongue Stadium, Gosford. Cannuli then scored her first goal on 15 May 2011 in another friendly against New Zealand in a 2–1 win at Bluetongue Stadium, Gosford.

Coaching career
Beginning in 2016 Cannuli she started working as a technical director overseeing women's football with the Southern Districts Soccer Football Association (SDSFA). She is also a playing coach of the association's team, SD Raiders, in the New South Wales State League Women's competition. She led the Raiders to the State League Women's championship in 2016.

In October 2017, after leading SD Raiders to back-to-back Grand Final victories, Cannuli joined Western Sydney Wanderers as an assistant coach under Richard Byrne.

In June 2021, Dean Heffernan stepped down from his coaching role and Cannuli was promoted to be head coach of the team.

Honours

Club
With NSW Sapphires:
 Women's National Soccer League Championship: 2003
 
With Sydney FC:
 W-League Premiership: 2009
 W-League Championship: 2009

Individual
Women's National Soccer League Golden Boot: 2003–04

References 

1986 births
Australian women's soccer players
Australian people of Italian descent
Living people
Sydney FC (A-League Women) players
Brisbane Roar FC (A-League Women) players
Western Sydney Wanderers FC (A-League Women) players
A-League Women players
Women's association football forwards
Australia women's international soccer players
Soccer players from Sydney